The name Ivan was used for three tropical cyclones in the Atlantic Ocean, one in the Western Pacific Ocean, one in the South-West Indian Ocean, and one in the Australian region.

In the Atlantic:
Hurricane Ivan (1980) – Category 2 hurricane that looped over the north-central Atlantic.
Hurricane Ivan (1998) – Category 1 hurricane that stayed well out to sea.
Hurricane Ivan (2004) – Category 5 hurricane, struck the Windward Islands, Jamaica, the Cayman Islands, Cuba, Alabama and Texas. 

The name Ivan was retired after the hurricane of 2004 and was replaced by Igor for the 2010 season.

In the Western Pacific:
 Typhoon Ivan (1997) (T9723, 27W, Narsing) – Category 5 super typhoon, struck the Philippines

In the South-West Indian:
 Cyclone Ivan (2008) – made landfall on Madagascar, killing 93.

In the Australian region:
 Cyclone Ivan (1979) – remained over the open ocean.

Atlantic hurricane set index articles
Pacific typhoon set index articles
South-West Indian Ocean cyclone set index articles
Australian region cyclone set index articles